Drymoea alcera is a species of moth in the family Geometridae first described by Jean Baptiste Boisduval in 1870. This species can be found in Bolivia.

References

Moths described in 1870
Ennominae
Geometridae of South America
Moths of South America